Lone Fir Cemetery in the southeast section of Portland, Oregon, United States is a cemetery owned and maintained by Metro, a regional government entity. Listed on the National Register of Historic Places, the first burial was in 1846 with the cemetery established in 1855.

History

19th and 20th centuries

The original land owner, James B. Stephens, purchased a land claim extending from the east bank of the Willamette River to present day Southeast 23rd and from Stark Street to Division Street. J. B. Stephens' father Emmor Stephens died shortly after the Stephens family arrived to Oregon in 1846 and was buried on the family farm. In 1854, Stephens sold the land to Colburn Barrell, with the caveat that he maintain Emmor's gravesite. Barrell owned a steamboat the Gazelle, which in 1854 exploded near Oregon City, killing a passenger and Barrell's business partner Crawford Dobbins. Barrel then set up a cemetery by setting aside  and burying the casualties of the explosion at the site of Emmor Stephens, calling it Mt. Crawford.

Plots at the cemetery were then sold for $10 with  additional being added to Lone Fir by 1866. That year Barrel offered to sell the cemetery to the city of Portland for $4,000, but the city declined and instead Barrell sold it to a group of Portland families and plotholders. The cemetery was then renamed the cemetery to Lone Fir, which was suggested by Colburn Barrell's wife, Aurelia, as there was only a single fir tree at the site.

In 1903, a $3,500 memorial to the soldiers of the Indian Wars, Mexican–American War, the American Civil War, and the Spanish–American War was built at the cemetery. The Soldier's Monument was paid for by donations by over 500 citizens. Then in 1928 Multnomah County took over control and maintenance of Lone Fir. In 1947 the county paved part of the cemetery and later constructed a building on the site. This was the location of many Chinese graves, which were removed the next year.

21st century
In 2004 it was discovered that more graves of Chinese persons likely remained at the site. In 2005 city leaders proposed removing the government building that was constructed over the graves of these Chinese immigrants and re-connecting that portion with the main cemetery; it was removed in August 2007. In January 2007 Metro took over control of this section of the cemetery after a transfer from the county. On August 16, 2007, the cemetery was added to the National Register of Historic Places. On November 25, 2020, portions of the cemetery's war memorial honoring Mexican-American soldiers were vandalized with graffiti, The statue which stood atop this section of the war memorial was toppled and vandalized with graffiti as well.

Currently the cemetery is located between Stark Street on the north and Morrison Street to the south, with Southeast 20th Avenue bounding on the west and Southeast 26th on the east. It is home to the Pioneer Rose Garden.

Notable burials
The cemetery is the resting place for several former mayors of the city, as well as other politicians and famous citizens.

See also 
 Anti-Chinese violence in Oregon
 Hillsboro Pioneer Cemetery
 River View Cemetery (Portland, Oregon)

References

External links

Metro Pioneer Cemetery Program
Friends of Lone Fir Cemetery
Lone Fir Cemetery: famous names at Find a Grave
Willamette Week: Portland's most interesting residents don't walk the streets. At least you'd better hope they don't.
Interesting burials at Lone Fir
History in stone: Metro's pioneer cemeteries are filling up and wearing out – The Oregonian

1855 establishments in Oregon Territory
Buckman, Portland, Oregon
Cemeteries in Portland, Oregon
Cemeteries on the National Register of Historic Places in Oregon
Historic districts on the National Register of Historic Places in Oregon
Metro (Oregon regional government)
National Register of Historic Places in Portland, Oregon
Portland Historic Landmarks